Agberto Conceição Guimarães (born August 18, 1957) is a former Brazilian middle distance runner who competed at the international level in the 1980s. He set a personal best 800 metres time of 1:43.63 min in Koblenz 1984, a performance which made him temporarily the second-fastest South American 800m runner ever.

Guimarães first participated in major international championships at the 1980 Moscow Olympics where he placed fourth in 800 metres (see, for example, "Moscow Olympic Book" / Moskovan Olympiakirja, Tapio Pekola et al., eds., Helsinki, Finland:  "Runner" / Juoksija magazine, 1980).

Guimarães came sixth in the 800 m final at the 1983 World Championships in Athletics in Helsinki. He won two gold medals and two bronze medals at the Pan American Games. Nowadays Guimarães works at the Brazilian Olympic Committee as its Olympic Solidarity Programme general manager.

References 
 
 

1957 births
Living people
Brazilian male middle-distance runners
Athletes (track and field) at the 1980 Summer Olympics
Athletes (track and field) at the 1984 Summer Olympics
Athletes (track and field) at the 1988 Summer Olympics
Athletes (track and field) at the 1979 Pan American Games
Athletes (track and field) at the 1983 Pan American Games
Olympic athletes of Brazil
Pan American Games gold medalists for Brazil
Pan American Games medalists in athletics (track and field)
World Athletics Championships athletes for Brazil
Medalists at the 1979 Pan American Games
Medalists at the 1983 Pan American Games
20th-century Brazilian people